Here Comes the Groom is a 1934 American Pre-Code comedy film directed by Edward Sedgwick and written by Richard Flournoy and Casey Robinson. The film stars Jack Haley, Mary Boland, Neil Hamilton, Patricia Ellis, Isabel Jewell, Lawrence Gray and Sidney Toler. The film was released on June 22, 1934, by Paramount Pictures.

The film's sets were designed by the art director David S. Garber.

Plot

Cast
Jack Haley as Mike Scanlon
Mary Boland as Mrs. Widden
Neil Hamilton as Jim
Patricia Ellis as Patricia Randolph
Isabel Jewell as Angy
Lawrence Gray as Marvin Hale
Sidney Toler as Detective Weaver
E. H. Calvert as George Randolph
James P. Burtis as 1st Cop
Ward Bond as Second Cop
James Farley as Third Cop
Fred Toones as Porter
Arthur Treacher as Butler
Ernie Adams as 1st Gunman
Eddie Sturgis as 2nd Gunman

References

External links 
 

1934 films
1930s English-language films
American comedy films
1934 comedy films
Paramount Pictures films
Films directed by Edward Sedgwick
American black-and-white films
1930s American films